Parasparam  ( Each other) was an Indian Malayalam television thriller series that was broadcast on Asianet. It is an official remake of Star Plus's serial Diya Aur Baati Hum. The series premiered on 22 July 2013. It starred Gayatri Arun and Vivek Gopan and was produced by Ross Petals. The last episode aired on 31 August 2018 with 1,524 episodes becoming Malayalam's longest ran soap opera.

Plot 
Ambitious and educated, Deepti pursues her dream of becoming an IPS officer for her father. Sooraj, a partially-educated and simple young master-confectioner is the perfect elder heir to his middle-class traditional family.

Deepti's dreams and aspirations are destroyed as she loses her parents in an accident. Planning to move abroad, her brother Gopan fixes her marriage to Sooraj whose strict mother Padmavathi "Padma" wants her daughter-in-law to be simple and not well-educated, with the excellent skills of a housewife.

After discovering this, Gopan lies about Deepti's education level to ensure her settlement. Deepti gives up her education and dreams, accepting her roles as a wife and the elder daughter-in-law of the family. Soon, as her truth of being educated and not knowing cooking is revealed, Padma banishes her.

Sooraj stands up for Deepti and vows to teach her everything she must know to prepare herself as the daughter-in-law that Padma expects. Deepti starts caring for Sooraj and helps him in various situations including an international confection competition in Singapore.

Later, Sooraj helps Deepti complete her studies. Eventually, he convinces Padma to accept Deepti and her dreams. Deepti faces great challenges in the IPS Academy, establishing herself as an extraordinary police officer.

As a police officer, Deepti fights various criminals including terrorist leaders, while in the meantime, solving her various family problems as she struggles to balance between her professional duties and domestic responsibilities.

Together with Sooraj, Deepti forms a deep relationship with underlying love, until misunderstandings tear them apart. But it gets cleared up and they reunite. Deepti donates one of her kidneys to Padma battling for life which is unknown to the family.

Gopan's little son Nandu greatly eagers for a sibling but his wife Sandya miscarries and is unable to conceive again. Expecting twins, Deepti and Sooraj decide to give their one twin to Sandya on Nandu's demand.

Later, Sooraj and Padma learn that Deepti is her kidney donor. Deepti delivers twin sons Dhirav and Dhyaan. The infants are kidnapped in order to be sold. In the ensuing rescue actions, Dhirav is saved and Dhyaan is believed to have succumbed to his death shattering all. A police officer saves Dhyaan though and returns him promptly.

9 years later

Deepti and Sooraj live happily with Dhirav however her brother cut all ties with Deepti as he believes her initial instinct was to save Dhirav and not Dhyaan.

Soon, Dhyaan discovers his true parents but hates them for giving him away. Eventually, Gopan and Sandya realises their mistake and gives Dhyan to Deepti and Sooraj.

Climax
Deepti and Sooraj unsuccessfully try a trap for the terrorists and punish them. The leader makes Deepti and Sooraj eat bomb pills.

Deepti and Sooraj bid their farewell to family and others by jumping into the river before exploding. They both jump together in the water before the setting Sun, highlighting that even death cannot separate them.

Cast

Main cast

 Gayatri Arun as Deepthi Sooraj IPS (Voice dubbed by Devi S.): Aravind and Kanchana's daughter, Gopan's Lil Sister, Sooraj's wife, Padma and Krishna's eldest daughter-in-law. Sandya, Suresh, Subash and Suchitra's elder sister-in-law. Meenakshi, Smriti and Dileep's co-sister. Dhirav and Dhyaan's mother. Ann, Aryan and Nandu's aunt.
 Vivek Gopan  as Sooraj Krishnan(voice dubbed by Shankar Lal): Deepti's husband, Aravind and Kanchana's Son-in-law, Padma and Krishna's eldest son, Suresh, Subash and Suchitra's elder brother. Meenakshi, Smriti, Gopan and Dileep's brother in law. Dhirav and Dhyaan's father. Ann, Aryan and Nandu's uncle
 Rekha Ratheesh as Padippuraveettil Padmavathi "Padma": Krishna's wife, Sooraj, Suresh, Subash and Suchitra's mother. Deepti, Meenakshi, Smriti and Dileep's mother-in-law. Ann, Aryan, Dhirav and Dhyaan's grandmother.
 Kottayam Pradeep as Krishna: Padma's husband. Sooraj, Suresh, Subash and Suchitra's father. Deepti, Meenakshi, Smriti and Dileep's father-in-law. Dhirav, Dhyaan, Ann and Aryan's grandfather.
 Sreenath Swaminathan as Suresh Krishnan: Meenakshi's husband. Sooraj's younger brother, Subash and Suchitra's elder brother. Deepti, Smriti and Dileep's brother-in-law. Padma and Krishna's second son. Ann's father. Aryan, Dhirav and Dhyaan's uncle.
 Sneha Diwakar as Meenakshi Suresh: Suresh's wife. Sooraj, Subash and Suchitra's sister-in-law. Deepti, Smriti and Dileep's co-sister. Ann's mother. Aryan, Dhirav and Dhyaan's aunt. Padma and Krishna's daughter-in-law.
 Muhammad Rafi as Sabir IPS: Deepti's close friend and colleague. A brave police officer.
 Leswin as Dhyan.S: Deepti and Sooraj's son, Dhirav's twin brother. Padma and Krishna's grandson. Aryan and Ann's cousin. Suresh, Subash, Suchitra, Meenakshi, Smriti and Dileep's nephew.
 Gautam Praveen as Dheerav.S: Deepti and Sooraj's son, Dhyaan's twin brother. Padma and Krishna's grandson. Aryan and Ann's cousin. Suresh, Subash, Suchitra, Meeakshi, Smriti and Dileep's nephew.
Darshan D Nair as Aryan, Subhash and Smriti's son, Padmavati's and Krishnan's grandson

Recurring cast 
 Valsala Menon as Muthashi: Krishna's mother. Padma's mother-in-law. Sooraj, Suresh, Subash and Suchitra's grandmother. Dhirav, Dhyaan, Ann and Aryan's great-grandmother.
 Lekshmi Pramod as Smriti: Subash's wife. Aryan's mother. Sooraj, Suresh and Suchitra's sister-in-law. Deepti, Meenakshi and Dileep's co-sister.
Chilanka replaced Pramod as Smruthy
 Vijay Viswanthan as Gopan: Deepti's brother. Sandya's husband. Dhyaan's adoptive father. Nandu's father.
Hari replaced Viswanthan as Gopan
 Divya Nithin as Sandya Gopan: Deepti's sister-in-law, Gopan's wife, Dhyaan's adoptive mother, Nandu's mother.
Indulekha replaced Nithin as Sandhya
 Niranj Menon as Subash: Smriti's husband, Aryan's father. Padma and Krishna's third son.
Manu Martin Pallippadan replaced Menon as Subash
Naresh Eswar replaced Pallippadan as Subash
 Amika Mariyam as Ann: Meenakshi and Suresh's daughter.
 Revathi Krishana as Suchitra Dileep: Dileep's wife, Padma and Krishna's youngest daughter.
Ruby Jewel replaced Krishana as Suchitra
 Sabari Chandran as Dileep. Suchitra's husband. 
 Shobha Mohan as Devika
 Shobi Thilakan as SI Dhanapalan
 Kollam Thulasi as rishikesh
 Manu Varma as Thomas
 Dileep Shankar as Cherian
 Ashraf Pezhumoodu as Advocate
 Anu Gopi as Kokku
 Poojappura Radhakrishnan
 Jolly Easow as Vasantha: Meera and Meenakshi's mother.
 Apsara as Rasiya Sabir 
 Irfan as Appu
Adil Mohammed replaced Irfan as Appu
 Thanvi S Raveendran as Jennifer Hills/Merin/Vineetha
 Ardra das as Athira
 Navya as Prema
 Akshaya R. Nair as Disha
 Anitha Nair as Maya
 Sarath Swamy as Jeevan
 Althara as Kavitha
 Anitta Dcruz as Nitha
 Sruthi Suresh as Nandana
 Shruthi Suresh as Anupama
 Soniya Baiju Kottarakkara as Rabiya
 Snehalatha as Kalyani
 Suki Panthalam as Shyamkumar
 Meghna as Keerthana
 Sreekala as Broker
 Priya as Kanchana
 Sajith as Aravindan
 Maya Moushmi as Deepthi's aunt
 Faisal Mohammed as Advocate
 Sreekanth as Terrorist
 Lavanya 
 Omana Ouseph
 Nandana Gowri
 Sindhu Varma as Kathreena
 Riyas Narmakala as Thakkol Vasu
 Mahima as Nanditha Mukherjee
 Karthika Kannan
 Jija Surendran
 Uma Devi Nair
 Sumi Santhosh
 Santhosh Krishna
 Vanchiyoor Praveen Kumar
 Sree Padma
 Vindhuja Vikraman

Guest appearances
Aswathy as Amala
Amith as Jithan
Shelly Kishore as Shalini

Awards

7th Asianet Television Awards 2014  

 Best Serial – Parasparam (Producer Jayakumar)
 Best Screenplay – Pradeep Panicker
 Best Actor – Vivek Gopan
 Best Actress – Rekha Ratheesh
 Best New Face (female) – Gayatri Arun
 Best Actor in Negative role – Shobi
 Best Actor in Character role – Kottayam Pradeep
 Special Jury Awards (Negative role) – Sneha
 Best Audiographer (sabdha mishram) – Sreejith V.G
Lifetime Achievement Award-
 Best Dubbing Artist (male) – Sankar Lal
 Best Dubbing Artist (female) – Nithuna

8th Asianet Television Awards 2015

Outstanding Hit serial - Parasparam
Best Actress - Gayatri Arun
Popular Actor - Vivek Gopan
Character Actress - Rekha ratheesh
Best Dialogues - Gireesh Gramika
Special Jury Award(Negative role) - Sneha
Special JuryAward(Director) - Manjudharman
Best Serial - Parasparam
Popular Actress - Gayatri Arun
Youth icon - Vivek Gopan
Character Actress - Rekha Ratheesh
Best Script Writer - Gireesh Gramika
Best dubbing Artist (Female) - Devi. S.

9th Asianet Television Awards 2016  

Best serial - Parasparam
Popular Actress - Gayatri Arun
Youth icon - Vivek Gopan
Character Actress - Rekha Ratheesh
Best Videographer - Manoj kumar
Best Editor - Rajesh Thrishur
Best Audiographer - Sreejith V.G
Best Script Writer - Girish Gramika
Best dubbing Artist (Female) -  Devi S

10th Asianet Television Awards 2017  

Longest Running Serial - Parasparam
Best Star pair - Vivek & Gayathri
Iconic beauty - Gayathri Arun
Character Actress - Rekha Ratheesh
Best Audiographer - Sreejith V.G
Best Editor - Rajesh Thrishur
Best Dubbing Artist (male) - Sankar Lal

11th Asianet Television Awards 2018

Evergreen hit Serial - Parasparam
Best Actress - Gayathri Arun
Best Director - Harison
Character Actor - Kottayam Pradeep
Special jury Award ( Popular Actor) - Vivek Gopan
Special Jury Award( Character Actress) - Rekha Ratheesh

Asiavision Television Awards

Best Pair - Vivek & Gayathri

Reception

Critics
Deccan Chronicle stated, "The serial Parasparam came as a breath of fresh air among the usual unending tear-jerkers; the main attraction was the fearless and clever IPS Deepthi who took on criminals single-handedly and became a role model for many youngsters."

Impact
A post where the still of the lead pairs before a bomb explosion sequence went viral which was falsely claimed as Kerala IPS officer and husband were killed by ISIS jehadis. This was reported as accusing  Pinarayi Vijayan led Kerala government for their inefficiency.

References

External links
 

2013 Indian television series debuts
Malayalam-language television shows
Asianet (TV channel) original programming